Makgotso Monyemorathoe (born 5 October 1991) is a South African actress. Her television work includes the Mzansi Magic drama Is'Thunzi (2016–2017) and the Showmax miniseries The Girl from St. Agnes (2019). She appeared in the historical epic film The Woman King (2022).

Early life
Monyemorathoe was born in Katlehong and spent her early childhood in Alberton, where she attended Alberview Primary School. She is Zulu on her mother's side and Pedi on her father's side. In 2003 at the age of eleven, she moved to England with her mother, a nurse, and sister. They first lived in Brighton, where she attended East Brighton College of Media and Art (COMART), and then Hitchin, where she attended The Priory School. During this time, she became a naturalised British citizen.

Upon moving to England, Monyemorathoe became interested in drama, participating in school productions and local clubs. She completed A Levels in Theatre Studies, Media, and Psychology before going on to study at Brunel University London. She also joined the National Youth Theatre. After graduating with a Bachelor of Arts in Theatre and Film Studies, she returned to South Africa in 2014.

Career
Monyemorathoe made her television debut in 2014 with a guest appearance in the third season of My Perfect Family on SABC1 followed by her film debut in Ayanda directed by Sara Blecher and produced by Terry Pheto.

2016 saw Monyemorathoe's breakout as she joined the soap operas Isidingo as Kamogelo Tsotetsi and Muvhango as Onika. That October, she began starring in the Mzansi Magic teen drama Is'Thunzi, playing the role of Tishiwe for both of its seasons. Monyemorathoe had a main role as Moipone Molopo in the 2019 Showmax mystery miniseries The Girl from St. Agnes. She had a supporting role in the BET+ original A Royal Surprise from Zimbabwean filmmaker Beautie Masvaure Alt.

In early 2022, it was announced Monyemorathoe had been cast in the historical epic film The Woman King directed by Gina Prince-Bythewood and produced by Viola Davis.

Filmography

Film

Television

Notes

References

External links
 
 Makgotso M at TVSA

Living people
21st-century South African actresses
Actresses from Brighton
Actresses from Hertfordshire
Alumni of Brunel University London
National Youth Theatre members
Naturalised citizens of the United Kingdom
Northern Sotho people
People from Alberton, Gauteng
People from Hitchin
People from Katlehong
Zulu people
1991 births